ICRR may refer to:

 The Institute for Cosmic Ray Research of the University of Tokyo
 The Illinois Central Railroad
 The Inter-Capital and Regional Rail